Hans Borgen (24 September 1908 –  12 September 1983) was a Norwegian politician for the Centre Party.

He was elected to the Norwegian Parliament from Akershus in 1950, and was re-elected on four occasions. From August to September 1963 he served as the Minister of Agriculture during the short-lived centre-right cabinet Lyng. During this time his place in the Parliament was taken by Hans Christian Brevig.

Borgen, born in Fet, was a member the executive committee of Fet municipality council in the periods 1947–1951, 1951–1955 and 1955–1959.

References

1908 births
1983 deaths
Members of the Storting
Centre Party (Norway) politicians
Ministers of Agriculture and Food of Norway
Akershus politicians
People from Fet
20th-century Norwegian politicians